Super Girls Football Club is a women's association football club based in Tyre, Lebanon. Founded in 2019, they compete in the Lebanese Women's Football League.

History 
Founded in 2019, Super Girls made their debut in the 2019–20 Lebanese Women's Football League, finishing in 6th place in Group A.

See also
 Lebanese Women's Football League
 Women's football in Lebanon
 List of women's association football clubs in Lebanon

References

Super Girls FC
Women's football clubs in Lebanon
2019 establishments in Lebanon
Association football clubs established in 2019